Tongues is a 2007 album by Kieran Hebden and Steve Reid.

Track listing
All tracks composed by Kieran Hebden and Steve Reid; except where indicated
"The Sun Never Sets" – 5:50 
"Brain" – 3:48 
"Our Time" – 5:04 
"People Be Happy" – 4:42 
"Greensleeves" (Traditional; arranged by Hebden and Reid) - 2:39
"Rhythm Dance" – 6:51 
"Mirrors" – 3:11 
"The Squid" – 4:12 
"Superheroes" – 4:25 
"Left Handed, Left Minded" – 4:05

Personnel
Kieran Hebden – samples, electronics and guitar
Steve Reid – drums and percussion

External links
Kieran Hebden and Steve Reid - official website

2007 albums
Domino Recording Company albums
Albums produced by Kieran Hebden
Collaborative albums